Roscoea australis is a perennial herbaceous plant found in Burma, to the south of all other members of the genus. Most members of the ginger family (Zingiberaceae), to which it belongs, are tropical, but R. australis, like other species of Roscoea, grows in much colder mountainous regions.

Description

Roscoea australis is a perennial herbaceous plant. Like all members of the genus Roscoea, it dies back each year to a short vertical rhizome, to which are attached the tuberous roots. When growth begins again, "pseudostems" are produced: structures which resemble stems but are actually formed from the tightly wrapped bases (sheaths) of its leaves.

Flowers appear in May to July in the wild. The stem (peduncle) of the flower spike (inflorescence) is held within the leaves. The few flowers open one at a time and are purple or white. The bracts which subtend the flowers are shorter than the calyx. Each flower has the typical structure for Roscoea (see the diagrams in that article). There is a tube-shaped outer calyx which is spotted and pink-brown in colour, with a bluntly three-lobed apex. The labellum is split into two lobes at the end for about half of its length.

The seeds when they form are dark brown.

Taxonomy

Roscoea australis was first described scientifically by Elizabeth Jill Cowley, a botanist at the Royal Botanic Gardens, Kew, in 1982. The specific epithet australis means "southern"; the species occurs to the south of all other members of the genus.

Evolution and phylogeny

The family Zingiberaceae is mainly tropical in occurrence. The unusual mountainous distribution of Roscoea may have evolved relatively recently in response to the uplift taking place in the region in the last 50 million years or so due to the collision of the Indian and Asian tectonic plates.

Species of Roscoea divide into two clear groups, a Himalayan clade and a "Chinese" clade (which includes some species from outside China). The two clades correspond to a geographical separation, their main distributions being divided by the Brahmaputra River as it flows south at the end of the Himalayan mountain chain. It has been suggested that the genus may have originated in this area and then spread westwards along the Himalayas and eastwards into the mountains of China and its southern neighbours. R. australis falls into the Chinese clade as would be expected from its Burmese origin. It is similar to two members of this clade, R. tibetica and R. wardii. It differs from both in possessing a corolla tube which protrudes considerably from the sheathing leaves; in addition, it has a broader upper petal lobe than R. tibetica and smaller flowers than R. wardii.

Distribution and habitat

It has also been reported to be an epiphyte.

Cultivation

R. australis has been described as "not the easiest to grow" when in cultivation at the Royal Botanic Garden Edinburgh. Only seedlings were being grown at the Royal Botanic Gardens, Kew when Richard Wilford wrote an account of the cultivation of the genus, saying that Roscoea species generally require a relatively sunny position with moisture-retaining but well-drained soil. As they do not appear above ground until late spring or even early summer, they escape frost damage in regions where subzero temperatures occur.

For propagation, see Roscoea § Cultivation.

Notes and references

australis
Endemic flora of Myanmar
Plants described in 1982